Entente FC is a Nigerien football club based in Dosso. Their home games are played at Stade de Dosso.  

Football clubs in Niger